Ekin Çelebi (born 6 June 2000) is a German footballer who plays as a left-back for Hannover 96.

Career
Çelebi made his professional debut for Nitra in the Slovak Super Liga on 6 February 2021, coming on as a substitute in the 86th minute for Yanni Regäsel against Pohronie. The away match finished as a 3–1 loss.

References

External links
 
 
 
 

2000 births
Living people
German people of Turkish descent
Footballers from Nuremberg
German footballers
Turkish footballers
Association football fullbacks
Germany youth international footballers
Regionalliga players
Slovak Super Liga players
1. FC Nürnberg II players
1. FC Nürnberg players
FC Nitra players
VfB Stuttgart II players
Hannover 96 players
German expatriate footballers
German expatriate sportspeople in Slovakia
Expatriate footballers in Slovakia